This article lists notable fantasy novels (and novel series).   The books appear in alphabetical order by title (beginning with A to H) (ignoring "A", "An", and "The"); series are alphabetical by author-designated name or, if there is no such, some reasonable designation. Science-fiction novels and short-story collections are not included here.

A

Abhorsen Trilogy by Garth Nix
Acacia: The War With The Mein by David Anthony Durham
Adam Binder series by David R. Slayton
Aegypt series by John Crowley
Akata Witch by Nnedi Okorafor
Akata Warrior by Nnedi Okorafor
Aladore by Henry Newbolt
Alice in Wonderland by Lewis Carroll
Alphabet of Thorn by Patricia McKillip
The Tales of Alvin Maker series by Orson Scott Card
An Ember in the Ashes series by Sabaa Tahir 
The Amazing Adventures of Kavalier & Clay  by Michael Chabon
The Amber series by Roger Zelazny
American Gods by Neil Gaiman
Among Others by Jo Walton
An Awfully Beastly Business series by David Sinden, Matthew Morgan, and Guy Macdonald
The Anubis Gates by Tim Powers
Apprentice Adept series by Piers Anthony
Arafel duo by C. J. Cherryh
The Artefacts of Power by Maggie Furey
Artemis Fowl series by Eoin Colfer.
At Swim-Two-Birds by Flann O'Brien
At the Back of the North Wind by George MacDonald

B
The Bards of Bone Plain by Patricia A. McKillip
Barsoom series by Edgar Rice Burroughs
The Bartimaeus Trilogy by Jonathan Stroud
Bas-Lag by China Miéville
The Battle of Apocalypse by Eduardo Spohr
Beauty by Robin McKinley
Beauty by Sheri S. Tepper
Beautiful Darkness (novel) by Kami Garcia and Margaret Stohl
Beautiful Creatures (book) by Kami Garcia and Margaret Stohl
The Belgariad series by David Eddings
The Bell at Sealey Head by Patricia A. McKillip
Beyond the Golden Stair by Hannes Bok
Beyonders: A World Without Heroes by Brandon Mull
Beyond the Spiderwick Chronicles by Holly Black
The BFG by Roald Dahl
The Bitterbynde trilogy by Cecilia Dart-Thornton
Black Blossom by Boban Knežević
The Black Company saga by Glen Cook, a nested set of sub-series
The Black Jewels trilogy by Anne Bishop
The Black Magician (novel series) by Trudi Canavan
The Black Swan by Mercedes Lackey
The Black Tides of Heaven by JY Yang
Bloodring by Faith Hunter
Blood Song by Anthony Ryan
The Blue Star by Fletcher Pratt
The Blue Sword by Robin McKinley
Boggart series by Susan Cooper
Bone Dance by Emma Bull
The Book of Atrix Wolfe by Patricia McKillip
Book of Enchantments by Patricia C. Wrede
The Book of the New Sun series by Gene Wolfe
The Book of Stars series by Erik L'Homme
The Books of Abarat by Clive Barker
Brak the Barbarian by John Jakes
Brown Girl in the Ring by Nalo Hopkinson
Bloodlines by Richelle Mead

C
Callipygia by Lin Carter
Captain Slaughterboard Drops Anchor by Mervyn Peake
Cats Have No Lord by Will Shetterly
The Changeling Sea by Patricia A. McKillip
Chapel of Ease by Alex Bledsoe
Charlie and the Chocolate Factory by Roald Dahl
Charlie Bone Series by Jenny Nimmo
The Chathrand Voyage Quartet by Robert V.S. Redick
Chernevog by C. J. Cherryh
Children of the Lamp series by P.B. Kerr
Children of Blood and Bone series by Tomi Adeyemi 
Chimera by John Barth
Chrestomanci series by Diana Wynne Jones
Chronicles of an Age of Darkness by Hugh Cook
Chronicles of Ancient Darkness by Michelle Paver
Chronicles of Brothers series by Wendy Alec
The Chronicles of Narnia by C.S. Lewis - see at N, below
The Chronicles of Prydain by Lloyd Alexander
Chronicles of The Raven by James Barclay
The Chronicles of Thomas Covenant series by Stephen R. Donaldson - see at T,
The Circus of Dr. Lao by Charles G. Finney
The City Beautiful by Aden Polydoros
City of Bones by Martha Wells
The City of Brass (novel) by S. A. Chakraborty
The Claidi Journals by Tanith Lee
Coldfire Trilogy by Celia S. Friedman
Cold Tom by Sally Prue
Conan series by Robert E. Howard and others
Coraline by Neil Gaiman
A Court of Thorns and Roses by Sarah J. Maas
The Cottingley Cuckoo by Alison Littlewood
The Cottingley Secret by Hazel Gaynor
The Court of the Air by Stephen Hunt
The Craft Sequence by Max Gladstone
The Crock of Gold by James Stephens
The Cygnet and the Firebird by Patricia A. McKillip

D
The Dagger and the Coin series by Daniel Abraham
Dalemark Quartet by Diana Wynne Jones
The Dalkey Archive by Flann O'Brien
Damiano series by R. A. MacAvoy
The Dark Artifices trilogy by Cassandra Clare
The Dark Is Rising sequence by Susan Cooper
The Dark Tower series by Stephen King
Daughter of the Lioness series by Tamora Pierce
The Death of the Necromancer by Martha Wells
Deltora series by Emily Rodda
The Deptford Mice by Robin Jarvis
Deryni novels by Katherine Kurtz
Descent into Hell by Charles Williams
Dirk Gently series by Douglas Adams
Discworld series by Terry Pratchett
The Divine Cities series by Robert Jackson Bennett
The Door in the Hedge by Robin McKinley
The Door Within Trilogy by Wayne Thomas Batson
Dorothea Dreams by Suzy McKee Charnas
The Dragon House by Darrell Schweitzer
The Dragonslayer's Apprentice by David Calder
Dragoncharm trilogy by Graham Edwards
The Dragon's Familiar by Lawrence Jeffrey Cohen
Dragonlance Chronicles trilogy by Margaret Weis and Tracy Hickman
Dragon Raja by Lee Yeongdo
Dragon Rider by Cornelia Funke
The Dragonbone Chair by Tad Williams
The Dragonology Chronicles: The Dragon's Eye by Dugald Steer
Dragonriders of Pern series by Anne McCaffrey
Dragonrouge by Lin Carter
Dragonsbane by Barbara Hambly
Dragonvarld trilogy by Margaret Weis
The Dreamwalker's Child by Steve Voake
The Drawing of the Dark by Tim Powers
The Dreamstone by C. J. Cherryh
The Dresden Files series by Jim Butcher
Drizzt Do'Urden novels by R. A. Salvatore
Durand Col series by David Keck. Series has no official name, however Durand Col is generally used because he is the central focus of all the novels.
The Dying Earth series by Jack Vance

E
Ealdwood by C. J. Cherryh
Earthsea series by Ursula K. Le Guin
The Edge Chronicles by Paul Stewart and Chris Riddell
Elantris by Brandon Sanderson
The Elenium series by David Eddings
Elric of Melnibone by Michael Moorcock
Ella Enchanted by Gail Carson Levine
The Empire Trilogy by Raymond E. Feist and Janny Wurts
The Enchanted Castle by E. Nesbit
Enchanted Forest series by Patricia C. Wrede
Eon: Dragoneye Reborn by Alison Goodman
Eragon by Christopher Paolini
Eldest by Christopher Paolini
Excalibur by Sanders Anne Laubenthal
Expecting Someone Taller by Tom Holt
The Eyes of the Dragon by Stephen King

F
Fablehaven series by Brandon Mull 
Faery in Shadow by C. J. Cherryh
The Face in the Frost by John Bellairs
The Faerie Wars Chronicles by Herbie Brennan
Fafhrd and the Gray Mouser series by Fritz Leiber
The Fairies of Sadieville by Alex Bledsoe
Fantastic Beasts and Where to Find Them by J.K. Rowling
Farsala trilogy by Hilari Bell
The Farseer Trilogy by Robin Hobb
The Fates of the Princes of Dyfed by Kenneth Morris
Fearsome Creatures of the Lumberwoods by William T. Cox
A Fine and Private Place by Peter S. Beagle
The Fionavar Tapestry by Guy Gavriel Kay
Fisher King series by Tim Powers
Fledgling by Octavia Butler
Flesh and Fire by Laura Anne Gilman
Flying Dutch by Tom Holt
The Fool on the Hill by Matt Ruff
The Forgotten Beasts of Eld by Patricia McKillip
Fortress series by C. J. Cherryh
Fourth Mansions by R. A. Lafferty

G
Garrett series by Glen Cook
Gather Her Round by Alex Bledsoe
Gezeitenwelt series by Magus Magellan
The Ghost and The Goth by Stacey Kade
Ghost Blows Out the Light by Zhang Muye
Ghostwritten by David Mitchell
Giant of World's End by Lin Carter
The Girl in a Swing by Richard Adams
Gloriana, or The Unfulfill'd Queen by Michael Moorcock
The Goblin Emperor by Katherine Addison
The Goblin Mirror by C. J. Cherryh
Gods of Jade and Shadow by Silvia Moreno-Garcia
Gods upon a time by Dai Idris and Martin Newman
The Golem and the Jinni by Helene Wecker
Gormenghast series by Mervyn Peake - see at T (Titus), below
Graceling by Kristin Cashore
The Great God Pan by Arthur Machen
The Green Child  by Herbert Read
The Green Round by Arthur Machen
Green Rider by Kristen Britain
Grendel  by John Gardner
Grishaverse by Leigh Bardugo
Guardians of Ga'Hoole series by Kathryn Lasky

H
The Hagwood Books by Robin Jarvis
Half a Soul by Olivia Atwater
The Halfblood Chronicles by Mercedes Lackey and Andre Norton
Haroun and the Sea of Stories by Salman Rushdie
Harry Potter series by J. K. Rowling
Hart's Hope by Orson Scott Card
The Haunted Woman by David Lindsay
The Haunting of Hill House by Shirley Jackson
The Heart of What Was Lost by Tad Williams
The Heavenly Fox by Richard Parks
Here Comes the Sun by Tom Holt
Hereafter, and After by Richard Parks
Heroes of the Valley by Jonathan Stroud
The Heroes of Olympus by Rick Riordan
The Hidden People by Alison Littlewood
The Hill of Dreams  by Arthur Machen
His Dark Materials series by Philip Pullman
History of The Vollplaen by Daniel Johnson
The Hobbit by J. R. R. Tolkien
The Hounds of the Morrigan by Pat O'Shea
The House on the Borderland by William Hope Hodgson
House of Night by P.C. Cast
The House on Parchment Street by Patricia A. McKillip
The House with a Clock in Its Walls by John Bellairs
Howl's Moving Castle by Diana Wynne Jones
The Hum and the Shiver by Alex Bledsoe
The Hundred Thousand Kingdoms by N. K. Jemisin
Hush, Hush by Becca Fitzpatrick

See also
 List of fantasy authors
 List of science fiction novels
 List of fantasy story collections
 List of alternate history fiction

References

 
Novels (A-H)
Lists of books by genre
Lists of novels